Astrid Loch-Wilkinson  (born 14 September 1982), also known as Astrid Radjenovic, is an Australian bobsledder who has competed since 2003.

Background
She was born in Sydney and educated at Abbotsleigh, Wahroonga and Sydney University, where she qualified in veterinary science.  Loch-Wilkinson was a national finalist in 400 metres hurdles.  She took up bobsleigh at the suggestion of Hannah Campbell-Pegg, Australia's first Olympic woman luge competitor.

Sporting career
Loch-Wilkinson has been in two Winter Olympics, earning her best finish of 14th in the two-woman event at the 2006 Winter Olympics in Turin.  After Turin, her brakeman Kylie Reed retired and Loch-Wilkinson did not compete the following season because of the high costs involved.  She made a comeback in late 2009 in the Americas Cup and Europa Cup. After an appeal to the Court of Arbitration for Sport, Loch-Wilkinson and brakeman Cecila McIntosh were allowed to compete at the 2010 Winter Olympics in Canada. They placed 19th in an event marred by spectacular crashes by the British and Germany 2 teams. After attracting a corporate sponsor, Loch-Wilkinson set about rebuilding a new team with better equipment and competed in Europe in 2010–2011. In that season she finished 10th and 9th in Europa Cup in Igls and 8th in Cesana Pariol in Italy in fields of up to 20 sleds that included 4 Olympic finalists from 2010. In January 2011 Loch-Wilkinson and brakewoman Jamie Hedge were readmitted to the elite World Cup Tour, their best placing being 13th in the final race in Cesana Pariol, prior to the World Championships in Koenigsee.

Loch-Wilkinson finished 23rd at the FIBT World Championships in the two-woman event at Calgary in 2005. With Jamie Hedge she won a bronze medal in Europa Cup in January 2011. At the FIBT World Championships in Königsee in February 2011 she finished 14th of 22 sleds, with novice brakeman Fiona Cullen. She competed in the World Cup Tour in 2011/2012. In Altenberg, Germany in January 2012 she achieved 9th place (with novice brakewoman Ebony Gorincu) – hitherto the best ever placing by any Australian bobsledder (male or female) in elite international competition. She followed this up with three more top 10 placings in the latter half of the World Cup Tour. At season's end in 2012, she was placed 11th overall in the World Cup rankings. In late 2010 Astrid married Vuk Rađenović, the Captain of Serbia's 2&4-man bob teams. After the 2014 Sochi Olympic Games, and 4 years of marriage, Vuk left the marriage after an affair with German Bobsledder Stefanie Szczurek. Loch-Wilkinson is said to have been devastated by the discovery.

In 2012/2013, the Aussie Icebirds were one of only a few teams to contest every race in a 9 race World Cup series. In late December 2012 the team was joined by former world champion 400-metre hurdler, Jana Pittman, a former track and field training partner of Astrid. They took 7th place in a field of 13 sleds in early January 2013 on the challenging Altenberg track in Germany. This was the best ever result by any Australian bobsled. In the World Championships later that month in St Moritz the ageing equipment used by the Aussies became their greatest hurdle. Despite this, the team managed to record the 8th fastest time of all 22 sleds in the third of a 4 heat contest, a time that bettered that of 2 of the fancied German sleds. A public appeal was launched in Australia for sponsorships to buy a new sled and runners prior to the Sochi 2014 Games, which raised over $20,000 from individual small donors.

References

External links
 
 Astrid Loch-Wilkinson (-Rađenović) profile at Sports-Reference.com

1982 births
Living people
Australian female bobsledders
Sportswomen from New South Wales
Sportswomen from Queensland
Bobsledders at the 2006 Winter Olympics
Bobsledders at the 2010 Winter Olympics
Bobsledders at the 2014 Winter Olympics
Olympic bobsledders of Australia
Sportspeople from Brisbane
Sportspeople from Sydney
People educated at Abbotsleigh
21st-century Australian women